Isojärvi National Park is a national park in Central Finland. Its scenery is fluctuating by its level and the vegetation is dominated by Scots pine and Norway spruce forests and bogs. Imprints of early human settlement and cultivation have been found in the area. The national park is located by the lake Isojärvi after which it has got its name.

There are two nature trails (marked with red paint) and several other ring trails (marked with blue paint). Most trails depart from Heretty or Kalalahti parking area. The trails vary in length and difficulty, being between 3.5 km and 20 km long. It is one of the largest parks in the region with over 30 kilometers of trails.

See also 
 List of national parks of Finland
 Protected areas of Finland

References

External links
 Outdoors.fi – Isojärvi National Park
Outinthenature.com - Exploring Isojärvi National Park

Protected areas established in 1982
Geography of Central Finland
Kuhmoinen
Tourist attractions in Central Finland Region
1982 establishments in Finland
National parks of Finland